The Hlai, also known as Li or Lizu, are a Kra–Dai-speaking ethnic group, one of the 56 ethnic groups officially recognized by the People's Republic of China. The vast majority live off the southern coast of China on Hainan Island, where they are the largest minority ethnic group. Divided into the five branches of the Qi (Gei), Ha, Run (Zwn), Sai (Tai, Jiamao) and Meifu (Moifau), the Hlai have their own distinctive culture and customs.

Names
黎 (Lí), which was pronounced /lei/ in Middle Chinese is the Chinese transcription of their native name, which is Hlai. They are sometimes also known as the "Sai" or "Say". During China's Sui Dynasty, their ancestors were known by various names, including Lǐliáo, a general term encompassing several non-Han ethnic groups in Southern China. The name Li first is recorded during the Later Tang period (923–937 CE).

History
Liang & Zhang (1996:18-21) believe that the original homeland of the Hlai languages was the Leizhou Peninsula, and estimate that the Hlai had migrated across the Hainan Strait to Hainan island about 4,000 years before present. According to Schafer, the Li people were originally spread out across the continental coastline, covering Northern Vietnam and the area west of Guangzhou, including Hainan. Their names were converted into the Chinese clan name Li. The earliest mention of the term Li as an ethnonym was in the Han dynasty, referring to people of the highlands of Central Vietnam at Jiuzhen (Vietnamese: Cửu Chân). After the Han dynasty these people were primarily located in Guangxi and western Guangdong.  

The 3rd century Nanzhou Yiwuzhi mentioned bandits called Lǐ (俚) who lived south of Guangzhou in the five commanderies: Cangwu, Yulin, Hepu, Ningpu and Gaoliang. They lived in villages with no walls and took refuge in the mountains and narrow passes. They did not have commanders or lords. In the early 6th century, the Liang dynasty waged war on the Li people, calling it the "pacification of the Li dong". In the Tang dynasty, the Li people of northern Vietnam were assigned a separate administrative status among the populace of the Annan protectorate, only paying half the taxes of ordinary subjects. By the 11th century, records no longer mention the Li on the mainland.

State administration of Hainan's lowlands was indirect until the Song dynasty and state control of the inland mountains was indirect until the 1950s. By the 11th century, Chinese records state that Hlai people were living close to Chinese settlements and paid taxes to the central state. However by the end of the Ming dynasty in the mid-17th century, virtually all areas of Hainan capable of intense cultivation had been settled by Han Chinese, while the Hlai filled the niche of supplying mountain products. By 1700, the Qing dynasty had re-established administration over Hainan. Migrant merchants started entering Hainan and threatened the economic niche of the Hlai, who broke out in violent protest against these "guest merchants" in 1766.

In 1751, He Xiang wrote an essay titled "Arguments against Settling the Li and Establishing Counties." In it he explained that Hainan was dangerous not because the Hlai people were fierce, but because of malaria and poisonous animals. He mocked previous campaigns against the Hlai for conquering hamlets of no value or significance while several thousand troops died of malaria. The highlands inhabited by the Hlai were also not economically valuable, and therefore had not yet been transformed. While many Chinese generals had made a name for themselves by "settling Guangdong", they all left the Hlai alone.

During the Japanese occupation of Hainan (1939–1945), the Hlai suffered extremely heavily due to their communist resistance activities especially in western Hainan. Hlai villages were frequently targeted for extermination and rape by Kuomintang and Japanese soldiers. In four towns alone, the Japanese slaughtered more than 10,000 Hlai people. The Hlai were persecuted by the Nationalists partly due to their support of the Chinese Communist Party (CCP). Nationalist forces massacred over 7,000 Hlai in a village. Nationalist officers had 9,000 Hlai and 3,000 Miao executed after tricking them to the war fronts during a fake conscription campaign. As the Nationalists retreated with over 1.5 million civilians that they evacuated to the hills with, they massacred and stole food from the ethnic Hlai as well as other tribal peoples. The Nationalists executed 2,180 Miao women and children of Baisha and Baoting uprising origin.

Because the Hlai sided with the CCP during the Chinese Civil War against the Nationalists, the Hlai are looked upon favorably by the government of the People's Republic of China.

Language
The Hlai speak the Hlai languages, a member of the Kra–Dai language family, but most can understand or speak Hainanese and Standard Chinese. The Jiamao language spoken natively by the Sai (also known as Tai or Jiamao) subgroup has been noted for its dissimilarity to the dialects or languages spoken by the other subgroups of the Hlai.

A Qing dynasty report on the Hlai dated 1756 claimed that they did not have a writing system.

Culture
Women were able to become political leaders in Hlai society. In 1171, a Hlai woman by the name of Wang Erniang was bestowed the title of "Lady of Suitability" by the Song court and given the post of commander-general over 36 ethnic groups in the south. She was the headwoman of the Hlai people and had a husband but nobody knew his name. She was very wealthy and adept at keeping order over her people. The Song dynasty communicated with non-Chinese southerners by relaying their orders through her. In 1181, her daughter inherited her position, and in 1216, another daughter inherited the position.

Among the Hlai, the women have a custom of tattooing their arms and backs after a certain age is reached.
The Hlai play a traditional wind instrument called kǒuxiāo and another called lìlāluó. The Hlai in Wenchang assimilated into the local population and pretended to be Hainanese while most of the Hlai population was exterminated in most other parts of Hainan only a small portion of the Hlai survived and fled to the mountains where they still maintain a Hlai identity.

Religion
The Hlai were primarily animists. According to Hlai legends, their clans each originated from the marriage of a woman and an animal. The most prominent animal is the snake. Leigong, the God of Thunder, laid a snake on Li Mountain. From the egg hatched a woman named Limu (literally "mother of the Li") who lived off of wild fruits and nested in the trees. Eventually she married and their descendants became the Hlai people. Another version says that the woman arrived on a ship and married a dog, giving birth to the Hlai. The Hlai also worshiped other animals such as the ox, which was represented in each house by a stone that they called the "soul of the ox." The "Oxen's Festival" was celebrated on the eighth day of the third lunar month every year. On that day the oxen were forbidden to be killed or worked. They stayed at home and were fed liquor believed to protect the ox and guarantee plentiful harvest. The "najiaxila" bird of legend was worshiped as a protector god for taking care of an ancestor woman of the Hlai. Dragons and cats were worshiped as well since they are considered to be ancestors.

Genetics
The Hlai are believed to be descendants of the Rau people, Kra–Dai-speaking tribes of ancient China, who settled on the island thousands of years ago. DNA analysis carried out amongst the modern Hlai population indicate a close relationship with populations in the Southern Chinese province of Guangxi, most of them have Y-DNA O1a and O1b.

Notable people
Su Yunying, singer

References

Bibliography

 
Ethnic groups officially recognized by China
Hainan